Lumicitabine (ALS-8176) is an antiviral drug which was developed as a treatment for respiratory syncytial virus (RSV) and human metapneumovirus (hMPV). It acts as an RNA polymerase inhibitor. While it showed promise in early clinical trials, poor results in Phase IIb trials led to it being discontinued from development for treatment of RSV. Research continues to determine whether it may be useful for the treatment of diseases caused by other RNA viruses, and it has been found to show activity against Nipah virus.

See also 
 Palivizumab
 Presatovir
 Ziresovir

References 

Anti–RNA virus drugs
Antiviral drugs
Tetrahydrofurans
Pyrimidines
Abandoned drugs